is a Japanese surname meaning "golden castle". The kanji used to write this surname may also be read Kinjō in on'yomi or Kanagusuku in the Okinawan language pronunciation. The former reading often indicates Okinawan origin, and the latter reading always does. Okinawans in mainland Japan with those two surnames sometimes change its reading to Kaneshiro without changing the characters. The surnames Kaneshiro and Kinjo are also found in the pass names of Koreans in Japan, formed by adding a second character to the common Korean surname Kim and then pronouncing the new name using Japanese rather than Korean reading.

People with the surname Kaneshiro include:

, Japanese rugby union player 
, Japanese sumo wrestler of Korean descent
, Japanese author of Korean descent
, Japanese manga artist
, Japanese-Taiwanese actor and singer of Okinawan and Taiwanese descent

People with the surname Kinjō include:
, Japanese ten-pin bowler from Okinawa
, Japanese baseball player of Korean descent
, Japanese theatre actor from Okinawa
, Japanese football midfielder (J2 League) from Okinawa
, Japanese football midfielder (2. Bundesliga) from Okinawa

References

Japanese-language surnames
Okinawan surnames